Aphria Inc., headquartered in Leamington, Ontario, is an international producer and distributor of medicinal and recreational cannabis. The company operates through retail and wholesale channels in Canada and internationally. Aphria is a main distributor of medical cannabis to Germany and has operations in over 10 additional countries outside of Canada. Aphria offers multiple products under a portfolio of recreational cannabis brands, including Good Supply,  B!NGO, Solei, RIFF, and Broken Coast. In November 2020, Aphria acquired SweetWater Brewing Company, one of the largest craft breweries in the USA.

Prior to its acquisition by Tilray, Aphria was one of the largest cannabis companies in the world, and was listed on both the Toronto Stock Exchange and NASDAQ. The  merger with Tilray was announced in December 2020, and Aphria operates under the Tilray name.

History 
Aphria was founded in 2013 by Cole Cacciavillani and John Cervini, who were Leamington greenhouse operators. Its CEO for its formative years was Vic Neufeld, formerly the CEO of Jamieson Laboratories, a Canadian vitamin company.  It was originally listed on the Toronto Venture Exchange from which it advanced to the Toronto Stock Exchange in March 2017, and joined the S&P/TSX Composite Index in December 2017.

In 2014, Health Canada granted Aphria a license to produce and sell medical cannabis.  Its first wholesale shipments were in April 2015.  Also in April 2015, it announced it would double the size of its greenhouse.

In January 2018, Aphria agreed to take over Broken Coast Cannabis, a Vancouver Island based premium cannabis producer. In May 2018, Aphria reached a deal with Southern Glazer's Wine & Spirits for that company to distribute Aphria's recreational cannabis products in Canada. 

Aphria nominated Irwin D. Simon, previously of The Hain Celestial Group, Inc., as Chair of the Board of Directors and interim CEO in December 2018. The company voluntarily delisted its stocks from the New York Stock Exchange in May 2020, in favour of listing them on NASDAQ. In 2020, its stock was delisted from the New York Stock Exchange in favor of solely listing shares on NASDAQ.

Tilray merger

On 15 December 2020, Aphria conducted a reverse acquisition to merge with Tilray, which would create the largest multinational cannabis company by revenue. The chief executive officer (CEO) of Aphria, Irwin Simon, stated that the merger strategy was to capture Tilray's business assets and public trading exposure in the United States and its free trade abilities in Europe, enabling potential for becoming a global operation. Irwin was named as CEO and chairman of the board for the merged company, and Tilray CEO, Brendan Kennedy, will be a member of the board of directors.

The merged companies will keep Tilray's name and trade under the Tilray ticker symbol, TLRY, on the NASDAQ exchange. By combining assets, the Aphria-Tilray company will develop craft beer and cannabis-infused beverages in partnership with Anheuser-Busch InBev, and have branded hemp and cannabidiol products. According to one source, the world market potential for cannabis products is $94 billion by 2025.

Plant Positivity 
Plant Positivity is a social impact platform developed by Aphria focused on raising awareness and educating individuals about the benefits of plants, plant garden, and the impact of plants on collective well-being. Six Plant Positivity Gardens have been developed in partnership with Evergreen, a Canadian non-profit organization, at Toronto's Don Valley Brick Works along with accompanying audio tours for patrons. These gardens add more than 50 varieties of native plant species. 

From January 20 to January 24, 2020, Aphria installed a Plant Positivity Winter Garden at Union Station's West Wing in Toronto. With a goal to combat the winter blues, the pop-up "event" launched on Blue Monday, which has been considered by some to be the "most depressing day of the year."

See also 
 Cannabis in Canada

References

External links 
 

Cannabis companies of Canada
Companies formerly listed on the Toronto Stock Exchange
Canadian companies established in 2014
Companies based in Ontario
Health care companies of Canada
Health care companies established in 2014
2021 mergers and acquisitions